Shin A-lam (or  ; born 23 September 1986) is a South Korean épée fencer.

Education
 2005 - 2009, Korea National Sport University.
 2002 - 2005 Girls High School, Geumsan, South Korea.

Career
 2006 Doha Asian Games - Women's National Fencing Team
 2010 Guangzhou Asian Games - Women's National Fencing Team
2011 Shenzhen  - Women's National Fencing Team
 2012 London Olympics - Women's national fencing Team
2016 Rio de Janeiro Olympics - Women's national fencing Team

2012 Summer Olympics
Shin competed at the 2012 Summer Olympics in the Women's épée in both the individual and team event. In the semifinals of women's individual épée, she lost to German Britta Heidemann after a timekeeping error extended bout time. The situation arose at the end of the one-minute overtime (sudden death) with the match tied 5-5. Without the extension, Shin would have won the tied bout on the basis of priority, which is randomly awarded to one fencer prior to the overtime period.

With one whole second showing on the official clock, Heidemann made two rapid attacks in succession, both halted by double-touches. The clock in the arena continued to show "00:01", because it could not display decimal fractions of a second. The referee then called "halt" to the bout. At this point, the timekeeper (a Games volunteer) restarted the clock, inadvertently expiring all the remaining time, reportedly 0.02 seconds. This action caused the arena clock to show "00:00", giving Shin reason to celebrate. However, the error was noted and since an overtime minute had to be fenced in its entirety, the referee applied FIE rule t.32-3, which states that in the event of a failure of the clock or an error by the timekeeper, the referee must estimate how much time is left. The timekeeper, with the referee's permission, reset the clock to show "00:01", one whole second being the minimum unit of time possible. Following the resumption of the bout, Heidemann scored a single touch just as the full second expired. The result was partly due to the failure of the referee to stop both fencers restarting closer than the specified distance, Heidemann's "crowding" to hurry her attack, and Shin trying to avoid retreating across her end line.

The South Koreans immediately appealed the decision, stating that 0.02s had already elapsed and the final touch occurred after the end of the bout. In accordance with fencing bylaws, Shin could not leave the piste while the officials deliberated the situation. Sobbing profusely, she sat alone for over an hour awaiting their decision. Ultimately, the judges gave the victory to Heidemann.

An hour later, Shin returned for the bronze medal match but lost to her Chinese opponent despite loud encouragement from the cheering crowd.

Later, the International Fencing Federation offered her a "special medal" after her semi-final defeat. She rejected the offer, saying "It does not make me feel better because it's not an Olympic medal. I don't accept the result because I believe it was a mistake."

Shin won a silver medal in Women's team épée competition five days later.

Television appearances
2020: King of Masked Singer (MBC), contestant as "Cherry Spirit" (episode 263)

See also
Controversies at the 2012 Summer Olympics

References

External links
 
 
 
 
 

1986 births
Living people
Sportspeople from South Chungcheong Province
South Korean female fencers
South Korean épée fencers
Fencers at the 2012 Summer Olympics
Fencers at the 2016 Summer Olympics
Olympic fencers of South Korea
Olympic silver medalists for South Korea
Olympic medalists in fencing
Medalists at the 2012 Summer Olympics
Fencers at the 2006 Asian Games
Fencers at the 2010 Asian Games
Fencers at the 2014 Asian Games
Fencers at the 2018 Asian Games
Asian Games silver medalists for South Korea
Asian Games bronze medalists for South Korea
Asian Games medalists in fencing
Medalists at the 2006 Asian Games
Medalists at the 2010 Asian Games
Medalists at the 2014 Asian Games
Medalists at the 2018 Asian Games
Universiade medalists in fencing
Universiade gold medalists for South Korea
Universiade silver medalists for South Korea
Universiade bronze medalists for South Korea
South Korean Buddhists
Medalists at the 2011 Summer Universiade
Medalists at the 2013 Summer Universiade
21st-century South Korean women